Harpalus fulvilabris is a species of ground beetle in the subfamily Harpalinae. It was described by Carl Gustaf Mannerheim in 1853.

References

fulvilabris
Beetles described in 1853
Taxa named by Carl Gustaf Mannerheim (naturalist)